Giessen (Gießen in German) is one of the three Regierungsbezirke of Hesse, Germany, located in the middle of the state. It was created from counties (kreise) of Giessen, Lahn-Dill, Limburg-Weilburg and Vogelsbergkreis in Darmstadt and Marburg-Biedenkopf of Kassel on 1 January 1981.

Economy 
The Gross domestic product (GDP) of the region was 35.9 billion € in 2018, accounting for 1.1% of German economic output. GDP per capita adjusted for purchasing power was 47,800 € or 105% of the EU27 average in the same year. The GDP per employee was 96% of the EU average. This makes it one of the wealthiest regions in Germany and Europe.

References

External links
 

NUTS 2 statistical regions of the European Union
Regions of Hesse
Middle Hesse
Government regions of Germany